The 1906 United States House of Representatives elections were held for the most part on November 6, 1906, with Oregon, Maine, and Vermont holding theirs early in either June or September. They occurred in the middle of President Theodore Roosevelt's second term. Elections were held for 386 seats of the United States House of Representatives, representing 45 states, to serve in the 60th United States Congress (Oklahoma would later gain statehood in 1907 and increase the House membership to 391).

As in many midterm elections, the President's Republican Party lost seats to the opposition Democratic Party, but retained a large overall majority.  Dissatisfaction with working conditions and resentment toward union busting among industrial laborers in the Mid-Atlantic and Midwest caused these groups to turn out to the polls in large numbers in support of the Democratic Party.  However, gains in these regions were not enough to remove the Republican majority or the firm support that the party held among the middle class.

Special elections

Election summaries

Election dates
In 1906, three states, with 8 seats among them, held elections early:

 June 4 Oregon
 September 4 Vermont
 September 10 Maine

Oklahoma was admitted in 1907 and held its first congressional elections on September 17, 1907.

Alabama

Arkansas

California

Colorado

Connecticut

Delaware

Florida

Georgia

Idaho 

|-
! 
| Burton L. French
|  | Republican
| 1902
| Incumbent re-elected.
| nowrap | 

|}

Illinois

Indiana

Iowa

Kansas

Kentucky

Louisiana

Maine

Maryland

Massachusetts 

|-
! 
| George P. Lawrence
|  | Republican
| 1897 (special)
| Incumbent re-elected.
| nowrap | 

|-
! 
| Frederick H. Gillett
|  | Republican
| 1892
| Incumbent re-elected.
| nowrap | 

|-
! 
| colspan="3"|Vacant
|  | Incumbent died November 1, 1906.New member elected.Republican hold.
| nowrap | 

|-
! 
| Charles Q. Tirrell
|  | Republican
| 1900
| Incumbent re-elected.
| nowrap | 

|-
! 
| Butler Ames
|  | Republican
| 1902
| Incumbent re-elected.
| nowrap | 

|-
! 
| Augustus Peabody Gardner
|  | Republican
| 1902 (special)
| Incumbent re-elected.
| nowrap | 

|-
! 
| Ernest W. Roberts
|  | Republican
| 1898
| Incumbent re-elected.
| nowrap | 

|-
! 
| Samuel W. McCall
|  | Republican
| 1892
| Incumbent re-elected.
| nowrap | 

|-
! 
| John A. Keliher
|  | Democratic
| 1902
| Incumbent re-elected.
| nowrap | 

|-
! 
| William S. McNary
|  | Democratic
| 1902
|  | Incumbent retired.New member elected.Democratic hold.
| nowrap | 

|-
! 
| John Andrew Sullivan
|  | Democratic
| 1902
|  | Incumbent retired.New member elected.Democratic hold.
| nowrap |  
|-
! 
| John W. Weeks
|  | Republican
| 1904
| Incumbent re-elected.
| nowrap |

|-
! 
| William S. Greene
|  | Republican
| 1898 (special)
| Incumbent re-elected.
| nowrap | 

|-
! 
| William C. Lovering
|  | Republican
| 1896
| Incumbent re-elected.
| nowrap | 

|}

Michigan

Minnesota

Mississippi 

|-
! 
| Ezekiel S. Candler Jr.
|  | Democratic
| 1900
| Incumbent re-elected.
| nowrap | 

|-
! 
| Thomas Spight
|  | Democratic
| 1898 (special)
| Incumbent re-elected.
| nowrap | 

|-
! 
| Benjamin G. Humphreys II
|  | Democratic
| 1902
| Incumbent re-elected.
| nowrap | 

|-
! 
| Wilson S. Hill
|  | Democratic
| 1902
| Incumbent re-elected.
| nowrap | 

|-
! 
| Adam M. Byrd
|  | Democratic
| 1902
| Incumbent re-elected.
| nowrap | 

|-
! 
| Eaton J. Bowers
|  | Democratic
| 1902
| Incumbent re-elected.
| nowrap | 

|-
! 
| Frank A. McLain
|  | Democratic
| 1898 (special)
| Incumbent re-elected.
|  nowrap | 

|-
! 
| John S. Williams
|  | Democratic
| 1892
| Incumbent re-elected.
| nowrap | 

|}

Missouri

Montana  

|-
! 
| Joseph M. Dixon
|  | Republican
| 1902
|  | Incumbent retired to run for U.S. senator.New member elected.Republican hold.
| nowrap | 

|}

Nebraska 

|-
! 
| Ernest M. Pollard
|  | Republican
| 1905 (special)
| Incumbent re-elected.
| nowrap | 

|-
! 
| John L. Kennedy
|  | Republican
| 1904
|  | Incumbent lost re-election.New member elected.Democratic gain.
| nowrap | 

|-
! 
| John McCarthy
|  | Republican
| 1902
|  | Incumbent lost renomination.New member elected.Republican hold.
| nowrap | 

|-
! 
| Edmund H. Hinshaw
|  | Republican
| 1902
| Incumbent re-elected.
| nowrap | 

|-
! 
| George W. Norris
|  | Republican
| 1902
| Incumbent re-elected.
| nowrap | 

|-
! 
| Moses Kinkaid
|  | Republican
| 1902
| Incumbent re-elected.
| nowrap | 

|}

Nevada

New Hampshire

New Jersey

New York

North Carolina

North Dakota  

|-
! rowspan=2 | 
| Thomas F. Marshall
|  | Republican
| nowrap | 1900
| Incumbent re-elected.
| nowrap rowspan=2 | 

|-
| Asle Gronna
|  | Republican
| nowrap | 1904
| Incumbent re-elected.

|}

Ohio

Oregon 

|-
! 
| Binger Hermann
|  | Republican
| 1903 (special)
|  | Incumbent retired.New member elected.Republican hold.
| nowrap | 
|-
! 
| John N. Williamson
|  | Republican
| 1902
|  | Incumbent retired.New member elected.Republican hold.
| nowrap | 
|}

Pennsylvania

Rhode Island

South Carolina

South Dakota  

|-
! rowspan=2 | 
| Charles H. Burke
|  | Republican
| 1898
|  | Incumbent lost renomination.New member elected.Republican hold.
| rowspan=2 nowrap | 

|-
| Eben Martin
|  | Republican
| 1900
|  | Incumbent retired to run for U.S. senator.New member elected.Republican hold.

|}

Tennessee  

|-
! 
| Walter P. Brownlow
|  | Republican
| 1896
| Incumbent re-elected.
| nowrap | 

|-
! 
| Nathan W. Hale
|  | Republican
| 1904
| Incumbent re-elected.
| nowrap | 

|-
! 
| John A. Moon
|  | Democratic
| 1896
| Incumbent re-elected.
| nowrap | 

|-
! 
| Mounce G. Butler
|  | Democratic
| 1904
|  |Incumbent lost renomination.New member elected.Democratic hold.
|  nowrap | 

|-
! 
| William C. Houston
|  | Democratic
| 1904
| Incumbent re-elected.
| nowrap | 

|-
! 
| John W. Gaines
|  | Democratic
| 1896
| Incumbent re-elected.
| nowrap | 

|-
! 
| Lemuel P. Padgett
|  | Democratic
| 1900
| Incumbent re-elected.
| nowrap | 

|-
! 
| Thetus W. Sims
|  | Democratic
| 1896
| Incumbent re-elected.
| nowrap | 

|-
! 
| Finis J. Garrett
|  | Democratic
| 1904
| Incumbent re-elected.
| nowrap | 

|-
! 
| Malcolm R. Patterson
|  | Democratic
| 1900
|  |Incumbent retired to run for Governor.New member elected.Democratic hold.
| 

|}

Texas

Utah

Vermont

Virginia

Washington

West Virginia 

|-
! 
| Blackburn B. Dovener
|  | Republican
| 1894
|  | Incumbent lost renomination.New member elected.Republican hold.
| nowrap | 

|-
! 
| Thomas B. Davis
|  | Democratic
| 1905 (special)
|  | Incumbent retired.New member elected.Republican gain.
| nowrap | 

|-
! 
| Joseph H. Gaines
|  | Republican
| 1900
| Incumbent re-elected.
| nowrap | 

|-
! 
| Harry C. Woodyard
|  | Republican
| 1902
| Incumbent re-elected.
| nowrap | 

|-
! 
| James A. Hughes
|  | Republican
| 1900
| Incumbent re-elected.
| nowrap | 

|}

Wisconsin

Wyoming  

|-
! 
| Frank W. Mondell
|  | Republican
| 1898
| Incumbent re-elected.
| nowrap | 

|}

Non-voting delegates

District of Alaska

New Mexico Territory 

New Mexico Territory elected its non-voting delegate November 6, 1906.

See also 
 1906 United States elections
 1906–07 United States Senate elections
 59th United States Congress
 60th United States Congress

Notes

References

Bibliography

External links
 Office of the Historian (Office of Art & Archives, Office of the Clerk, U.S. House of Representatives)